Monte Carlo is a 1986 American two-part, four-hour television miniseries starring Joan Collins and George Hamilton. An adaptation of the 1983 novel of the same name by Stephen Sheppard, it is a spy thriller set in Monaco during World War II. The miniseries was produced by Gerald W. Abrams, Collins and her then-husband Peter Holm.

Cast
 Joan Collins as Katrina Petrovna
 George Hamilton as Harry Price
 Lisa Eilbacher as Maggie Egan
 Lauren Hutton as Evelyn MacIntyre
 Robert Carradine as Bobby Morgan
 Malcolm McDowell as Christopher Quinn
 Peter Vaughan as Pabst

Production
Adapted from the 1983 novel Monte Carlo by Stephen Sheppard (Summit Books), the teleplay was written by Peter Lefcourt. The miniseries was produced by Gerald W. Abrams, Collins and her then-husband Peter Holm. Directed by Anthony Page, it was reported to have cost $9 million.

Broadcast and reception
The four-hour miniseries was broadcast in two parts on CBS starting on November 9, 1986. John J. O'Connor of The New York Times wrote that "Monte Carlo gives us the beginnings of World War II as they might have been conceived and executed by a couturier." He noted that Collins has "more than three dozen costume changes", and that she "is convinced that her fans want only romantic adventures and beautiful people in gorgeous clothes".

Collins also produced and starred in the CBS miniseries Sins earlier the same year.

References

External links 

1986 television films
1986 films
1980s American television miniseries
Television shows based on British novels
World War II television series
Espionage television series
Television shows set in Monaco
CBS network films
Films directed by Anthony Page
Films scored by Stanley Myers